Superfamily Tabanoidea are insects in the order Diptera.

Systematics
Tabanoidea

Family Athericidae
Sunfamily Dasyommatinae
Genus Dasyomma Macquart, 1840
Sunfamily Dasyommatinae
Genus Asuragina Yang & Nagatomi, 1992
Genus Atherix Meigen, 1803
Genus Atrichops Verrall, 1909 
Genus Microphora Krober, 1840
Genus Pachybates Bezzi, 1926
Genus Suragina Walker, 1858
Genus Suraginella Stuckenberg, 2000
Genus Trichacantha Stuckenberg, 1955
Genus Xeritha Stuckenberg, 1966
Genus Athericites Mostovski, Jarzembowski & Coram, 2003
Genus Succinatherix Stuckenberg, 1974 Baltic amber, Eocene
Family Oreoleptidae
Genus Oreoleptis Zloty, Sinclair, & Pritchard, 2005
Family Pelecorhynchidae
Genus Pelecorhynchus Macquart, 1850
Genus Glutops Burgess, 1878
Genus Pseudoerinna , 1932
Family Tabanidae
Subfamily Adersiinae
Genus Adersia Austen, 1912
Subfamily Chrysopsinae
Tribe Chrysopsini
Genus Chrysops Meigen, 1803
Genus Melissomorpha Ricardo, 1906
Genus Nemorius Rondani, 1856
Genus Neochrysops Walton, 1918
Genus Picromyza Quentin, 1979 (Sometimes placed in Chrysops)
Genus Silviomyza Philip & Mackerras, 1960
Genus Silvius Meigen, 1820
Genus Surcoufia Kröber, 1922
Tribe Bouvieromyiini
Genus Aegophagamyia Austen, 1912
Genus Eucompsa Enderlein, 1922
Genus Gressittia Philip & Mackerras, 1960
Genus Merycomyia Hine, 1912
Genus Paulianomyia Oldroyd, 1957
Genus Phibalomyia Taylor, 1920
Genus Pseudopangonia Ricardo, 1915
Genus Pseudotabanus Ricardo, 1915
Genus Rhigioglossa Wiedemann, 1828
Genus Thaumastomyia Philip & Mackerras, 1960
Tribe Rhinomyzini
Genus Alocella Quentin, 1990
Genus Betrequia Oldroyd, 1970
Genus Gastroxides Saunders, 1842
Genus Jashinea Oldroyd, 1970
Genus Mackerrasia Dias, 1956
Genus Oldroydiella Dias, 1955
Genus Orgizocella Quentin, 1990
Genus Orgizomyia Grünberg, 1906
Genus Rhinomyza Wiedemann, 1820
Genus Seguytabanus Paulian, 1962
Genus Sphecodemyia Austen, 1937
Genus Tabanocella Bigot, 1856
Genus Thaumastocera Grünberg, 1906
Genus Thriambeutes Grünberg, 1906
Subfamily Pangoniinae
Tribe Pangoniini Lessard, 2014
Genus Goniops Aldrich, 1892
Tribe Mycteromyiini
Genus Caenopangonia Kröber, 1930
Tribe Pangoniini
Genus Apatolestes Williston, 1885
Genus Asaphomyia Stone, 1953
Genus Austroplex Mackerras, 1955
Genus Brennania Philip, 1941
Genus Caenoprosopon Ricardo, 1915
Genus Ectenopsis Macquart, 1838
Genus Esenbeckia Rondani, 1863
Genus Nagatomyia Murdoch & Takashasi, 1961
Genus Pangonius Latreille, 1802
Genus Pegasomyia Burger, 1985
Genus Protosilvius Enderlein, 1922
Genus Stonemyia Brennan, 1935
Genus Therevopangonia Mackerras, 1955
Tribe Philolichini
Genus Philoliche Wiedemann, 1920
Tribe Scionini
Genus Anzomyia Lessard, 2012
Genus Aotearomyia  Lessard, 2014
Genus Apocampta Schiner, 1868
Genus Copidapha Enderlein, 1922
Genus Fidena Walker, 1850
Genus Lepmia Fairchild, 1969
Genus Myioscaptia Mackerras, 1955
Genus Osca Walker, 1850
Genus Palimmecomyia Taylor, 1917
Genus Parosca Enderlein, 1922
Genus Pityocera Giglio-Tos, 1896
Genus Plinthina Walker, 1850
Genus Pseudomelpia Enderlein, 1922
Genus Pseudoscione Lutz, 1918
Genus Scaptia Walker, 1850
Subgenus Plinthina Walker, 1850
Genus Scione Walker, 1850
Genus Triclista Enderlein, 1922
Tribe Scepsidini
Genus Scepsis Walker, 1850
 Incertae sedis within Pangoniinae
Genus Zophina  Philip, 1954
Subfamily Tabaninae
Tribe Diachlorini
Genus Acanthocera Macquart, 1834
Genus Acellomyia Gonzalez, 1999
Genus Anacimas Enderlein, 1923
Genus Anaerythrops Barretto, 1948
Genus Atelozella Bequaert, 1930
Genus Atelozomyia Dias, 1987
Genus Bartolomeudiasiella Dias, 1987
Genus Bolbodimyia Bigot, 1892
Genus Buestanmyia González, 2021
Genus Catachlorops Lutz, 1909
Genus Chalybosoma Oldroyd, 1949
Genus Chasmia Enderlein, 1922
Genus Chlorotabanus Lutz, 1909
Genus Cretotabanus Fairchild, 1969
Genus Cryptotylus Lutz, 1909
Genus Cydistomorpha Trojan, 1994
Genus Cydistomyia Taylor, 1919
Genus Dasybasis Macquart, 1847
Genus Dasychela Enderlein, 1922
Genus Dasyrhamphis Enderlein, 1922
Genus Diachlorus Osten Sacken, 1876
Genus Dichelacera Macquart, 1838
Genus Dicladocera Lutz, 1913
Genus Elephantotus Gorayeb, 2014
Genus Erioneura Barretto, 1951
Genus Eristalotabanus Kröber, 1931
Genus Eutabanus Kröber, 1930
Genus Hemichrysops Kröber, 1930
Genus Himantostylus Lutz, 1913
Genus Holcopsis Enderlein, 1923
Genus Japenoides Oldroyd, 1949
Genus Lepiselaga Macquart, 1938
Genus Leptapha Enderlein, 1923
Genus Leucotabanus Lutz, 1913
Genus Limata Oldroyd, 1954
Genus Lissimas Enderlein, 1922
Genus Microtabanus Fairchild, 1937
Genus Montismyia González, 2017
Genus Myiotabanus Lutz, 1928
Genus Nanorrhynchus Olsoufiev, 1937
Genus Neavella Oldroyd, 1954
Genus Neobolbodimyia Ricardo, 1913
Genus Oopelma Enderlein, 1923
Genus Pachyschelomyia Barretto, 1951
Genus Phaeotabanus Lutz, 1913
Genus Philipomyia Olsufjev, 1964
Genus Philipota Kapoor, 1991
Genus Philipotabanus Fairchild, 1943
Genus Pseudacanthocera Lutz, 1913
Genus Rhabdotylus Lutz, 1909
Genus Roquezia Wilkerson, 1985
Genus Selasoma Macquart, 1838
Genus Spilotabanus Fairchild, 1969
Genus Stenotabanus Lutz, 1913
Genus Stibasoma Schiner, 1867
Genus Stonemyia Burger, 1985
Genus Stypommisa Enderlein, 1923
Genus Teskeyellus Philip & Fairchild, 1974
Tribe Haematopotini
Genus Haematopota Meigen, 1803
Genus Heptatoma Meigen, 1803
Genus Hippocentrodes Philip, 1961
Genus Hippocentrum Austen, 1908
Tribe Tabanini
Genus Agkistrocerus Philip, 1941
Genus Ancala Enderlein, 1922
Genus Atylotus Osten Sacken, 1876
Genus Dasyrhamphis Enderlein, 1922
Genus Hamatabanus Philip, 1941
Genus Hybomitra Enderlein, 1922
Genus Poeciloderas Lutz, 1921
Genus Tabanus Linnaeus, 1758
Genus Therioplectes Zeller, 1842
Genus Whitneyomyia Bequaert, 1933

References

 
Diptera superfamilies